The Song of Songs, also called the Canticle of Canticles or the Song of Solomon, is an erotic poem, one of the five  ('scrolls') in the  ('writings'), the last section of the Tanakh. It is unique within the Hebrew Bible: it shows no interest in Law or Covenant or the God of Israel, nor does it teach or explore wisdom like Proverbs or Ecclesiastes (although it does have some affinities to wisdom literature, as the ascription to the 10th century BCE King of Israel Solomon indicates); instead, it celebrates sexual love, giving "the voices of two lovers, praising each other, yearning for each other, proffering invitations to enjoy".

The two lovers are in harmony, each desiring the other and rejoicing in sexual intimacy. The women of Jerusalem form a chorus to the lovers, functioning as an audience whose participation in the lovers' erotic encounters facilitates the participation of the reader.

Scholars differ in assessing when it was written, with estimates ranging from the 10th to 2nd century BCE, with linguistic analysis suggesting the 3rd century.

In modern Judaism, the Song is read on the Sabbath during the Passover, which marks the beginning of the grain-harvest as well as commemorating the Exodus from Biblical Egypt. Jewish tradition reads it as an allegory of the relationship between God and Israel; Christianity, as an allegory of Christ and his bride, the Church.

Structure 
There is widespread consensus that, although the book has no plot, it does have what can be called a framework, as indicated by the links between its beginning and end. Beyond this, however, there appears to be little agreement: attempts to find a chiastic structure have not been compelling, and attempts to analyse it into units have used different methods and arrived at differing results. 

The following schema, from Kugler and Hartin must therefore be taken as indicative, rather than determinative:

 Introduction (1:1–6)
 Dialogue between the lovers (1:7–2:7)
 The woman recalls a visit from her lover (2:8–17)
 The woman addresses the daughters of Zion (3:1–5)
 Sighting a royal wedding procession (3:6–11)
 The man describes his lover's beauty (4:1–5:1)
 The woman addresses the daughters of Jerusalem (5:2–6:4)
 The man describes his lover, who visits him (6:5–12)
 Observers describe the woman's beauty (6:13–8:4)
 Appendix (8:5–14)

Summary 

The introduction calls the poem "the song of songs", a construction commonly used in Scriptural Hebrew to show something as the greatest and most beautiful of its class (as in Holy of Holies). The poem proper begins with the woman's expression of desire for her lover and her self-description to the "daughters of Jerusalem": she insists on her sun-born blackness, likening it to the "tents of Kedar" (nomads) and the "curtains of Solomon". A dialogue between the lovers follows: the woman asks the man to meet; he replies with a lightly teasing tone. The two compete in offering flattering compliments ("my beloved is to me as a cluster of henna blossoms in the vineyards of En Gedi", "an apple tree among the trees of the wood", "a lily among brambles", while the bed they share is like a forest canopy). The section closes with the woman telling the daughters of Jerusalem not to stir up love such as hers until it is ready.

The woman recalls a visit from her lover in the springtime. She uses imagery from a shepherd's life, and she says of her lover that "he pastures his flock among the lilies".

The woman again addresses the daughters of Jerusalem, describing her fervent and ultimately successful search for her lover through the night-time streets of the city. When she finds him she takes him almost by force into the chamber in which her mother conceived her. She reveals that this is a dream, seen on her "bed at night" and ends by again warning the daughters of Jerusalem "not to stir up love until it is ready".

The next section reports a royal wedding procession. Solomon is mentioned by name, and the daughters of Jerusalem are invited to come out and see the spectacle.

The man describes his beloved: Her eyes are like doves, her hair is like a flock of goats, her teeth like shorn ewes, and so on from face to breasts. Place-names feature heavily: her neck is like the Tower of David, her smell like the scent of Lebanon. He hastens to summon his beloved, saying that he is ravished by even a single glance. The section becomes a "garden poem", in which he describes her as a "locked garden" (usually taken to mean that she is chaste). The woman invites the man to enter the garden and taste the fruits. The man accepts the invitation, and a third party tells them to eat, drink, "and be drunk with love".

The woman tells the daughters of Jerusalem of another dream. She was in her chamber when her lover knocked. She was slow to open, and when she did, he was gone. She searched through the streets again, but this time she failed to find him and the watchmen, who had helped her before, now beat her. She asks the daughters of Jerusalem to help her find him, and describes his physical good looks. Eventually, she admits her lover is in his garden, safe from harm, and committed to her as she is to him.

The man describes his beloved; the woman describes a rendezvous they have shared. (The last part is unclear and possibly corrupted.)

The people praise the beauty of the woman. The images are the same as those used elsewhere in the poem, but with an unusually dense use of place-names, e.g., pools of Hebron, gate of Bath-rabbim, tower of Damascus, etc. The man states his intention to enjoy the fruits of the woman's garden. The woman invites him to a tryst in the fields. She once more warns the daughters of Jerusalem against waking love until it is ready.

The woman compares love to death and Sheol: love is as relentless and jealous as these two, and cannot be quenched by any force. She summons her lover, using the language used before: he should come "like a gazelle or a young stag upon the mountain of spices".

Composition 
The poem seems to be rooted in festive performance, and connections have been proposed with the "sacred marriage" of Ishtar and Tammuz. It offers no clue to its author or to the date, place, or circumstances of its composition. The superscription states that it is "Solomon's", but even if this is meant to identify the author, it cannot be read as strictly as a similar modern statement. The most reliable evidence for its date is its language: Aramaic gradually replaced Hebrew after the end of the Babylonian exile in the late 6th century BCE, and the evidence of vocabulary, morphology, idiom and syntax clearly point to a late date, centuries after King Solomon to whom it is traditionally attributed. It has parallels with Mesopotamian and Egyptian love poetry from the first half of the 1st millennium, and with the pastoral idylls of Theocritus, a Greek poet who wrote in the first half of the 3rd century BCE; as a result of these conflicting signs, speculation ranges from the 10th to the 2nd centuries BCE, with the language supporting a date around the 3rd century.

Debate continues on the unity or disunity of the book. Those who see it as an anthology or collection point to the abrupt shifts of scene, speaker, subject matter and mood, and the lack of obvious structure or narrative. Those who hold it to be a single poem point out that it has no internal signs of composite origins, and view the repetitions and similarities among its parts as evidence of unity. Some claim to find a conscious artistic design underlying it, but there is no agreement among them on what this might be. The question, therefore, remains unresolved.

Canonisation and interpretation

Judaism 

The Song was accepted into the Jewish canon of scripture in the 2nd century CE, after a period of controversy in the 1st century. This period of controversy was a result of many rabbis seeing this text as merely "secular love poetry, a collection of love songs gathered around a single theme", and thus not worthy on canonization. In fact, "there is a tradition that even this book was considered as one to be excluded." It was accepted as canonical because of its supposed authorship by Solomon and based on an allegorical reading where the subject matter was taken to be not sexual desire but God's love for Israel. For instance, the famed first and second century Rabbi Akiva forbade the use of the Song of Songs in popular celebrations. He reportedly said, "He who sings the Song of Songs in wine taverns, treating it as if it were a vulgar song, forfeits his share in the world to come". However, Rabbi Akiva famously defended the canonicity of the Song of Songs, reportedly saying when the question came up of whether it should be considered a defiling work, "God forbid![...] For all of eternity in its entirety is not as worthy as the day on which Song of Songs was given to Israel, for all the Writings are holy, but Song of Songs is the Holy of Holies."

Other rabbinic scholars who have employed allegorical exegesis in explaining the meaning of Song of Songs are Tobiah ben Eliezer, author of Lekach Tov, and Zechariah ha-Rofé, author of Midrash ha-Hefez. 

Song of Songs is one of the overtly mystical Biblical texts for the Kabbalah, which gave esoteric interpretation on all the Hebrew Bible. Following the dissemination of the Zohar in the 13th century, Jewish mysticism took on a metaphorically anthropomorphic erotic element, and Song of Songs is an example of this. In Zoharic Kabbalah, God is represented by a system of ten sephirot emanations, each symbolizing a different attribute of God, comprising both male and female. The Shechina (indwelling Divine presence) was identified with the feminine sephira Malchut, the vessel of Kingship. This symbolizes the Jewish people, and in the body, the female form, identified with the woman in Song of Songs. Her beloved was identified with the male sephira Tiferet, the "Holy One Blessed be He", central principle in the beneficent heavenly flow of divine emotion. In the body, this represents the male torso, uniting through the sephira Yesod of the male sign of the covenant organ of procreation.

Through beneficent deeds and Jewish observance, the Jewish people restore cosmic harmony in the divine realm, healing the exile of the Shechina with God's transcendence, revealing the essential unity of God. This elevation of the world is aroused from above on the Sabbath, a foretaste of the redeemed purpose of Creation. The text thus became a description, depending on the aspect, of the creation of the world, the passage of Shabbat, the covenant with Israel, and the coming of the Messianic age. "Lecha Dodi", a 16th-century liturgical song with strong Kabbalistic symbolism, contains many passages, including its opening two words, taken directly from Song of Songs.

In modern Judaism, certain verses from the Song are read on Shabbat eve or at Passover, which marks the beginning of the grain harvest as well as commemorating the Exodus from Egypt, to symbolize the love between the Jewish people and their God. Jewish tradition reads it as an allegory of the relationship between God and Israel. The entire Song of Songs in its original Hebrew is read in synagogues during the intermediate days of Passover. It is often read from a scroll similar to a Torah scroll in style. It is also read in its entirety by some at the end of the Passover Seder and is usually printed in most Hagadahs. Some Jews have the custom to recite the entire book prior to the onset of the Jewish Sabbath.

Christianity 

The literal subject of the Song of Songs is love and sexual longing between a man and a woman, and it has little (or nothing) to say about the relationship of God and man; in order to find such a meaning it was necessary to resort to allegory, treating the love that the Song celebrates as an analogy for the love between God and Church. The Christian church's interpretation of the Song as evidence of God's love for his people, both collectively and individually, began with Origen. Over the centuries the emphases of interpretation shifted, first reading the Song as a depiction of the love between Christ and Church, the 11th century adding a moral element, and the 12th century understanding of the Bride as the Virgin Mary, with each new reading absorbing rather than simply replacing earlier ones, so that the commentary became ever more complex. These theological themes are not in the poem, but derive from a theological reading; nevertheless, what is notable about this approach is the way it leads to conclusions not found in the overtly theological books of the Bible. Those books reveal an abiding imbalance in the relationship between God and man, ranging from slight to enormous; but reading Songs as a theological metaphor produces quite a different outcome, one in which the two partners are equals, bound in a committed relationship.

In modern times the poem has attracted the attention of feminist biblical critics, with Phyllis Trible's foundational "Depatriarchalizing in Biblical Interpretation" treating it as an exemplary text, and the Feminist Companion to the Bible series edited by Athalya Brenner and Carole Fontaine devoting two volumes to it.

Musical settings 

Excerpts from the book have inspired composers to write vocal and instrumental compositions, including:

 A'l Mishkavi Baleylot for soprano and harp (1992) and Spring Calls for soprano and ensemble (2006) by Lior Navok
 Alex Weiser's After Shir Hashirim (2017) draws its inspiration from the text and cantillation of the Song of Songs.
Andrew Rose Gregory of The Gregory Brothers released the album The Song of Songs, with words and music based on the biblical text, with The Color Red Band in 2011.
Animals As Leaders's self-titled album includes a track titled "Song of Solomon".
 Asma Asmaton from the album Rapsodies by Vangelis and Irene Papas
  for solo viola (1976) by Tristan Murail
  by Giovanni Pierluigi da Palestrina: 29 five-part a cappella pieces in fourth volume of motets. (1584)
 David Lang's "Just (After Song of Songs)" (2014) was premiered in 2014 by Trio Mediaeval and Garth Knox Saltarello Trio. The piece is featured in the film Youth by Paolo Sorrentino.
 Dieterich Buxtehude's  (1680)
Eliza Gilkyson's "Rose of Sharon" on her album "Your town tonight" is based on her reading of Song of Songs in a hotel room Gideon Bible, as explained in her intro to the song.
 Flos Campi by Ralph Vaughan Williams, a suite for solo viola, small chorus and small orchestra (1925), each movement headed by a verse from the book
 J. S. Bach's , while mainly based on the Parable of the Ten Virgins, also uses words and imagery from the Song of Songs.
 John Zorn's "Shir Ha-Shirim" premiered in February 2008. The piece is inspired by Song of Songs and is performed by an amplified quintet of female singers with female and male narrators performing the "Song of Solomon". A performance at the Guggenheim Museum in November 2008 featured choreography for paired dancers from the Khmer Arts Ensemble by Sophiline Cheam Shapiro. In 2013 a new version featuring the five singers without the two narrators premièred in NYC at Alice Tully Hall and at the Jerusalem Sacred Music Festival and released on the album Shir Hashirim.
Kate Bush's "Song of Solomon" from her album The Red Shoes includes lyrics which quote and reference the Song of Songs.
  (1952) by Jean-Yves Daniel-Lesur
Lyudov Streicher (1888–1958) composed a musical setting for the Song of Songs.
 Nightstone (1979) for voice and piano by Arnold Rosner
 Rami Bar-Niv's Uri Tsafon (Song of Songs 4, 16: Awake, North Wind) (1972)
 Song of Solomon (1989) by Steve Kilbey
Song of Solomon (2017) classical wedding suite composition for orchestra, organ and two voices by Chris M. Allport
Subject of the Song I Hate Heaven by The Residents, which is featured in their bible inspired album Wormwood.
  (1629) by Heinrich Schütz
The chorus of Stephen Duffy's 1985 song "Kiss Me" was based on the comparison of wine to love in Song of Songs.
The opening track "Glass" off of Bat For Lashes's 2009 album Two Suns begins with a line from the Song of Songs.

In popular culture

Art 

Catherine L. Morris' 2009 collection The Song of Songs: A Love Poem Illustrated presents a series of paintings that visualize the book.
 Egon Tschirch's (de) "Song of Solomon", a 1923 expressionist nineteen-picture cycle, was rediscovered in 2015.
 Marc Chagall's "Song of Songs", a five-painting cycle, is housed in the Marc Chagall Museum in Nice.

Theater and film 
In Carl Theodor Dreyer's Day of Wrath, a film about sexual repression in a puritanical Protestant family, the first few verses of Song of Songs chapter 2 are read aloud by the daughter Anne, but soon after her father forbids her to continue. The chapter's verse paraphrases Anne's own amorous adventures and desires.
 Lillian Hellman's 1939 play The Little Foxes (and the 1941 film adaptation) gets its title from Song 2:15:  "Take us the foxes, the little foxes, that spoil the vines:  for our vines have tender grapes."
Several works have taken their name from the phrase "the voice of the turtle", found in (2:10-2:13).
The 1986 Malayalam classic film Namukku Parkkan Munthirithoppukal uses several verses from the Song of Songs which forms one of its major plot elements.
The 2014 film The Song is based on the Song of Songs.
The Jewish play The Dybbuk contains a recitation of the Song of Songs by Khanan's father when he is a young yeshiva boy. This becomes a major plot point in the play as it allows for the two lovers to identify the promise of marriage that their fathers made as classmates before departing.

Novels 

 In Elizabeth Smart's novel of prose poetry By Grand Central Station I Sat Down and Wept, several lines of the Song are spoken by the protagonist while she undergoes police questioning about her relationship with her companion, poet George Barker.
In The Woman in the Window (1944), the character played by Edward G. Robinson reads The Song of Songs prior to his romantic entanglement with Joan Bennett.
 Leon Garfield's masterwork The Pleasure Garden (1976) concludes with a reading of the first three chapters of the Song.
 Rose of Sharon (an epithet in the Song) is a major character in John Steinbeck's novel The Grapes of Wrath.
 The song is mentioned repeatedly in Sholem Aleichem's Jewish Children
 Toni Morrison's 1977 novel is entitled Song of Solomon.

See also 
 Dead Sea Scrolls 4Q106, 4Q107, 4Q108, 6Q6, fragments including portions of the Song of Songs.
 Hortus conclusus
 Ivory tower

Notes

References
 
 

 
 

 

 
 
 
 
.

External links

Jewish translations and commentary 
 Shir Hashirim – Song of Songs (Judaica Press) translation (with Rashi's commentary) at Chabad.org
 Song of Songs in the Jewish Encyclopedia
 The original Hebrew version, vowelized, with side-by-side English translation by Mamre Institute (Mechon Mamre)

Christian translations and commentary 
 Canticle of Canticles in the Catholic Encyclopedia
 Online Bible at GospelHall.org
Sermons on the Song of Songs, by St. Bernard of Clairvaux
  This provides an exhaustive contemporaneous Anglican analysis.
 Solomon's Song of Songs. Bible Study Tools.
  – Various versions
 Song of Songs (Greek, Latin and English versions) the newadvent.org
 Song of Songs at Bible Gateway (various versions)
 Summary Interpretation of the Song of Solomon by H. Speckard
 The Semantics of Love in the Song of Songs and Directions of Its Interpretation

 
4th-century BC books
3rd-century BC books
2nd-century BC books
Ketuvim
Erotic poetry
Passover
Solomon
Sexuality in Christianity
Judaism and sexuality
Gender in the Bible
Love stories
Poetic Books